Manor Park is a city park in Glossop, Derbyshire, England.

History

The park was originally part of the now demolished Glossop Hall, formerly called Royle Hall, and built circa 1729 by Kimberley Rose Clayton. In the mid-19th century the hall was extended and the roads around the hall re-routed. The site on which the hall resided was bought by Glossop Borough Council in April 1927 and Manor Park was officially opened in September 1927.

Features
The park has formal landscaping, a lake, floral displays, specimen trees, borders and shrubs, woodland walks, a pavilion, a cafe, crown green bowling, a skate park, a statue, a miniature railway and train which you can go on and it takes you through the woodlands, a children's play area, tennis courts, basketball courts, football pitches and a sensory garden. There is a ridable miniature railway. Glossop Parkrun takes place in the park every Saturday morning at 9am.

References

Parks and open spaces in Derbyshire